Helen Rose Hull (March 28, 1888 – July 15, 1971) was born in Albion, Michigan. She is remembered as a novelist, feminist, and English professor. Beginning her teaching career at Wellesley College and Barnard College, she went on to teach creative writing at the Ivy League institution, Columbia University for forty years with her lifelong partner, Mabel Louise Robinson.

Early life 
Hull was born in Albion, Michigan, as the eldest child of her family on March 28, 1888 to Warren C. and Minnie Louise McGill Hull. Her father was a teacher, school superintendent of the Albion Public Schools (1888 to 1901), and real estate agent; her mother a school teacher before marriage.  Hull's grandfather Levi T. Hull encouraged her as a child by publishing her stories in his Michigan newspaper, the Constantine Mercury. At a young age, Helen and her brother became financially responsible for their family, as their father remained unemployed after World War I.  Helen attended Lansing High School and Michigan State University. After graduating, she became an elementary school teacher.

Career 
In 1914, she began her career as a writer, which lasted for over fifty years. Her first published piece was a one-act play in the suffrage magazine, The Woman's Journal. Throughout her career, Hull managed to publish seventeen novels and sixty-five short stories. Her short stories appeared in more than fourteen different American magazines, including Colliers, Century, Saturday Evening Post, Harper's, Cosmopolitan, and Ladies Home Journal. The topic of her writing included familial relationships, gender differences, and social issues, including race and women's economic status. Despite being involved in radical politics early in life, Hull mainly addressed issues through the stories of her characters. It is speculated that her decreased involvement in the political scene was due to her publisher's concern that Hull's lesbianism would be "detrimental to her career."

Hull died in 1971 at the age of 83.

Quest and Islanders 
Hull's first novel, Quest, received generally positive reviews upon its publication in 1922. Another one of her notable novels, Islanders, was published in 1927 and is set in the Midwest during the mid-19th century to World War I. It tells the story of a single woman who has to take care of her parents, her siblings, and her siblings' children. Through the growth of this intelligent and inventive woman, Hull poses important questions about the role of a woman during this time period.

Reviews 
Her fictional pieces were praised by noteworthy sources including the New York Times, the New York Herald Tribune, and the Boston Transcript.

References

External links
 Finding aid to Helen Hull papers at Columbia University. Rare Book & Manuscript Library.

1888 births
1971 deaths
American women novelists
Columbia University faculty
Wellesley College faculty
20th-century American novelists
20th-century American women writers
American LGBT writers
Novelists from Massachusetts
Novelists from New York (state)
American women academics